Kevin O’Brien (born 1972) is an architect practising in Queensland, Australia.  He is noted for drawing on indigenous concepts of space in his work.

Early life and education
O'Brien was born in Melbourne, Australia. He graduated from the University of Queensland with a Bachelor of Architecture degree in 1995. In 2006, he studied Aboriginality and Architecture, gaining a Master of Philosophy under Paul Memmott.

Career
O'Brien also established Kevin O'Brien Architects (KOA) in Brisbane, and has completed architectural projects throughout several states in Australia. In 2000, he travelled around the Pacific Rim as a Churchill Fellow to investigate regional construction strategies in indigenous communities.

O'Brien directed the Finding Country Exhibition at the 13th Venice Architecture Biennale in 2012, and he was appointed as a Professor of Design at the Queensland University of Technology.

In 2014, he was a juror at the Australian Institute of Architects' 2014 Brisbane Regional Architecture Awards.

Kevin O'Brien Architects merged with BVN Architecture in 2018.

Notable projects

Finding Country Exhibition (2012) 

O'Brien's "Finding Country" Exhibition, focused on the tension between concepts of City and Country in an Australian context, and was exhibited at the 13th International Architecture Exhibit in Venice, Italy in 2012. A large drawing highlighting the city method of title management (by labelling places such as parks or roads), was emptied through a 50% population reduction as a way into revealing Country as something found; the exhibition developed from discussions with Michael Markham in 2005.

Archibald Street House (2012) 

Construction began on the Archibald Street House in August 2009, and reached practical completion in 2011. It is a two-storey residential building in Brisbane, which has a 3.5 kW solar power system that has produced enough energy to maintain a household of four. The building combines a house and a studio with a central courtyard. It is built using concrete and timber. Designed to minimise energy costs, the house efficiently uses new insulation techniques by employing water and solar collections. To achieve an effective energy consumption, the house was designed to make use of building orientation, ventilation access, thermal mass, insulation systems and energy-economical openings.

Woorabinda State School Library (2011) 

This project began its construction in 2009, poured on site concrete tilt panels, with steel structure, and clear finished plywood linings in the interiors with the completion in 2011. It was noted as a regional commendation for public buildings. The Woollam construction team was led by Chris Battersby. In February 2013, O'Brien received the QLD Architecture Award: Central Queensland Regional Commendation.

Other Projects

Awards

References

External links 
 Kevin O'Brien Architects
 The University of Queensland, Australia, Stories from Indigenous Postgraduates, Kevin O’Brien
 Robin Boyd Foundation, Zeitgeist l Lecture Series 2103, Kevin O’Brien
 Architecture Australia, 2013 Brisbane – Queensland Regional Architecture Awards
 Architecture Australia, 2013 National Architecture Awards: International

1972 births
Living people
Architects from Brisbane